Gisle Straume (26 August 1917 – 1 December 1988) was a Norwegian actor and theatre director.

Personal life 
Straume was born in Holla, the son of farmer and headmaster Eivind Straume and teacher Brita Monsine Skanke Aarnes. He married actress Julia Back in 1948. This marriage was later dissolved, and in 1963 he married journalist and actress Sonja Cora Christensen.

Career 
He was employed at Det Norske Teatret from 1945 to 1951, at Den Nationale Scene from 1951 to 1952, and again at Det Norske Teatret from 1952 to 1955. He served as theatre director at Rogaland Teater from 1956 to 1958, and for Den Nationale Scene from 1963 to 1967, and worked for the National Theatre in Oslo from 1959 to 1963 and from 1967 to 1976.

Straume was particularly popular for his role as "lektor Tørrdal" in Stompa (a Norwegian adaptation of the Jennings novels), a series of radio plays and films for children.

He was decorated Knight, First Class of the Order of St. Olav in 1983.

External sources

References

1917 births
1988 deaths
People from Nome, Norway
Norwegian theatre directors
Norwegian male stage actors
20th-century Norwegian male actors
 Recipients of the St. Olav's Medal